Strawberry Panic is a Japanese anime series produced by the animation studio Madhouse and is a part of the media franchise Strawberry Panic! which brings many different types of media together in a single series. The anime aired in Japan between April 3, 2006, and September 25, 2006, and contained twenty-six episodes. These episodes were later split into nine separate DVDs, the first of which went on sale in Japan on June 23, 2006; it contained the first two episodes. The anime's central theme is yuri (lesbian relationships). The anime is based on the short stories and manga that preceded it.

Media Blasters released four English-subtitled DVDs of Strawberry Panic between March 4 and September 2, 2008; a fifth and final DVD was released in November 2008. All English-subtitled DVDs contain five episodes, except for its first release, which contains six. The series premiered on Toku in the United States on December 31, 2015.

Episode list

Strawberry Panic
Episodes